Yekaviyeh-ye Yek (also Romanized as Yekāvīyeh-ye Yek; also known as Lekāvīgeh-ye Yek) is a village in Anaqcheh Rural District, in the Central District of Ahvaz County, Khuzestan Province, Iran. At the 2006 census, its population was 774, in 86 families.

References 

Populated places in Ahvaz County